Summit is the name of the following places in the U.S. state of Indiana:
Summit, DeKalb County, Indiana
Summit, Greene County, Indiana
Summit, Hendricks County, Indiana
Summit, LaPorte County, Indiana
Summit, Tippecanoe County, Indiana